Delbrück is a German surname. Notable people with the surname include:

Berthold Delbrück (1842–1922), linguist
Clemens von Delbrück, German politician
Gottlieb Adelbert Delbrück (1822–1890), lawyer, founder of Deutsche Bank
Hans Delbrück (1848–1921), historian
Max Delbrück (chemist) (1850–1919), chemist
Max Delbrück (1906–1981), biologist
Richard Delbrück (1875–1957), German archaeologist
Rudolf von Delbrück (1817–1903), German politician

German-language surnames

sv:Delbrück